The 1902 Pittsburgh Stars football season  was their first and only season in existence. The team played in the first National Football League and finished with an overall record of 9-2-1, including a 2-2-1 record in league play. The team was named the league's champions for having a better point ratio, scoring 39 points to their NFL opponents' 22.

Schedule

Games between NFL teams are represented in bold.

Game notes

References

Pittsburgh Stars